Llwyn is a Site of Special Scientific Interest in the preserved county of Clwyd, north Wales. The site is on the floodplain of the Rivers Clywedog and Clwyd, and includes peat beds and swamps. It was notified in 1983 and 2001.

See also
List of Sites of Special Scientific Interest in Clwyd

References 

Sites of Special Scientific Interest in Clwyd
Woodland Sites of Special Scientific Interest
Llanrhaeadr-yng-Nghinmeirch